Cecil Owen "Dick" Sturgeon (June 27, 1919February 1972) was an American football offensive tackle. He attended North Dakota State University.

In 1941, he played in the National Football League for the Philadelphia Eagles before joining the Wilmington Clippers for the rest of the year. In addition to playing both offense and defense for the Clippers, he worked at the Pusey & Jones shipyard in Wilmington.

During World War II, Sturgeon joined the United States Army in 1942 and worked in the military police for the 91st Division based at Camp White. He eventually went overseas and served with the United States Fifth Army. In 1945, he participated in the Spaghetti Bowl football game in Italy, where he was the captain of the Fifth Army team.

References

1919 births
1972 deaths
Gridiron football people from Saskatchewan
Canadian players of American football
American football offensive tackles
North Dakota State Bison football players
Philadelphia Eagles players
American military sports players
Wilmington Clippers players
People from Carnduff